The 2013 Mountain West Conference Football Championship Game determined the 2013 football champion of the Mountain West Conference (MW). The game, played at Bulldog Stadium on the campus of California State University, Fresno (Fresno State), was the first football conference championship game for the Mountain West Conference. The game featured the West Division champions Fresno State Bulldogs hosting the Mountain Division champions Utah State Aggies.

Fresno State won 24–17 and represented the Mountain West in the 2013 Las Vegas Bowl on December 21 in Las Vegas, Nevada after defeating Utah State by 7 points.

History
After the 2013 Mountain West Conference realignment, the league added two new members, San Jose State and Utah State for the 2013 season. By adding two new members for a total of 12 football members (11 all-sports members and football-only Hawaii), the MW was able to split into two divisions, the Mountain and the West, and to organize an annual conference championship game.

Teams

Mountain Division Champions

Utah State comes into the championship with a non–conference record of 1–3 after losing to former Mountain West member Utah, USC and BYU, while beating Weber State. Utah State was first in the Mountain Division standings with a conference record of 2–0 until losing to Boise State. Utah State then fell to third behind Wyoming and Boise State. Wyoming then lost to Colorado State which moved Boise State to first and Utah State to second in the standings. Boise State then lost a close game in overtime against San Diego State, which moved Utah State back at first in the division. By the end of the regular season, Utah State stayed undefeated after the loss to Boise State bringing the Aggies to their first division championship.

This was Utah State's first appearance in Mountain West Conference Championship series.

West Division Champions

Fresno State comes into the championship undefeated in non–conference games against Rutgers, Cal-Poly San Luis Obispo, and Idaho. Fresno State stayed undefeated winning close games against Boise State, Hawaii and San Diego State and rose to #14 in the BCS Polls prior to their last game of the regular season against San Jose. After Fresno State lost to San Jose State they fell to #22 but continued to stay at the top of their division as the other five teams in the West Division lost more than one conference game, which led the team to their first division championship.

This was Fresno State's first appearance in Mountain West Conference Championship series.

Scoring summary

Statistics

References

Championship
Mountain West Conference Football Championship Game
Fresno State Bulldogs football games
Utah State Aggies football games
Mountain West Conference Football Championship Game
Mountain West
2010s in Fresno, California